This is a list of local television stations in South America, including commercial, community and government-operated stations.

Argentina
América
Canal 7 Argentina
Canal 9
Telefé
Canal 13

Bolivia
ATB
Bolivision
TVB (Bolivia TV)
Red Uno de Bolivia
Unitel Bolivia

Brazil
Bandeirantes
Rede Globo
Rede Record
Rede TV
SBT (Sistema Brasileiro de Televisão)
TVE (Televisão Educativa)
TV Cultura (State of São Paulo government television network)

Chile
Telecanal
Red Televisión
UCV TV
TVN (Televisión Nacional de Chile)
Mega
Chilevisión
Canal 13 (UC TV)
Mas Canal 22

Colombia
Caracol TV
RCN Televisión 
Canal Uno
Señal Institucional
Señal Colombia
Teleantioquia
Canal 13
Canal Capital
Citytv Bogota
Caucavisión
Telecaribe
Telecafé
Teleislas
Televisión
Telepacífico
Telemedellín
Canal U

Peru
America TV
Andina TV
CM Deportes
Canal 33
Canal N
Congress Channel
Frecuencia Latina
Guia TV
OKTV Peru
Panamericana Televisión
Plus TV
Red Global
Television Nacional del Perú
Uranio TV

Venezuela
 List of Venezuelan television channels

References

South America